Wiesław Długosz (10 May 1948 – 19 December 2008) was a Polish rower. He competed in the men's coxed pair event at the 1972 Summer Olympics.

References

1948 births
2008 deaths
Polish male rowers
Olympic rowers of Poland
Rowers at the 1972 Summer Olympics
People from Masovian Voivodeship